Newfield Park may refer to:

 Newfield Park, Bridgeport, a park in Bridgeport, Connecticut that has previously been used as a baseball venue
 Newfield Park, Johnstone, a defunct football ground in Johnstone, Scotland
 Newfield Park Primary School, Halesowen, West Midlands, England

See also
 Newfield (disambiguation)